De Kreuners are a Flemish rock band established in 1978. They first received interest when they won the first Humo's Rock Rally in 1978, but didn't get a record contract. They self released their first three singles. They recorded their first single Nummer een in London. It became their first success. After these three singles, they signed with Warner Bros. and released in 1981  's Nachts kouder dan buiten. It sold 30,000 copies. By the time of their second album, 1982's Er sterft een beer in de taiga, they were one of Flanders' most successful bands, and the record became gold in two days time. In 1990 they switched to EMI and released their biggest success, the 1990 album Hier en nu, which sold 100,000 copies. The single Ik Wil Je has sold over 1 million copies (separate and on full CDs and compilations). Their best of Het beste van de Kreuners is already certified platina before its release date.
On 13 February 2012 the band announced officially the end of their career, which they will round off with two concerts in Belgium.

The current line-up consists of:
 Walter Grootaers: lead vocals
 Erik Wauters: guitar
 Axl Peleman: bass-guitar
 Jan Van Eyken: guitar
 Ben Crabbé: percussion

Axl Peleman is the replacement of original member Berre Bergen.

Discography
 1981  's Nachts kouder dan buiten
 1982 Er sterft een beer in de taiga
 1983 Natuurlijk zijn er geen Alpen in de Pyreneeën
 1984 Weekends in België
 1986 Dans der onschuld
 1990 Hier en nu
 1991 Het beste van De Kreuners
 1992 Knagend vuur
 1995 De Kreuners
 1998 Pure Pop
 2000 / 2003 Originele hits / Essential
 2003 1978
 2003 25 jaar het beste van De Kreuners
 2005 DVD - Live 2005
 2008 30 Jaar de Kreuners (3CD box)

Singles

Notes

External links
Website de Kreuners
English language biography

Belgian rock music groups